Oleg Sergeyevich Garin (born 22 September 1966) is a Russian professional football coach and former player.

He made his professional debut in the Soviet Second League in 1986 for FC Luch Vladivostok.

His nephew Aleksandr Tikhonovetsky is a professional footballer.

Honours
 Russian Premier League runner-up: 1995.
 Russian Premier League bronze: 1994.
 Russian Cup winner: 1996, 1997.
 Top 33 year-end best players list: 1992, 1994, 1995.

European club competitions
With FC Lokomotiv Moscow.

 UEFA Cup 1993–94: 1 game.
 UEFA Cup 1995–96: 2 games.
 UEFA Cup Winners' Cup 1996–97: 1 game.

References

1966 births
Living people
People from Nakhodka
Soviet footballers
Russian footballers
Russian football managers
FC Luch Vladivostok players
FC Okean Nakhodka players
Russian Premier League players
FC Lokomotiv Moscow players
FC Lokomotiv Nizhny Novgorod players
FC Elista players
FC Lada-Tolyatti players
FC Okean Nakhodka managers
Association football forwards
Sportspeople from Primorsky Krai